The Pavlovac Castle was a noble court and one of the largest and most important fortified towns of medieval Bosnia, situated on top of rugged slopes high above the Prača river canyon, near modern days Prača village, in Bosnia and Herzegovina. Fortified castle was a seat of medieval Bosnian noble family Radinović-Pavlović.

Old and New structure
The family hailed and ruled from Pavlovac. It is the second of two castles in their possession, which the family used as a seat. Two castles were built in the space of several decades and within a few kilometers from each other, second being Borač castle or Old Town, and sometimes Old Borač.

Pavlovac
The new castle or New Town, or sometimes New Borač, is actually called Pavlovac, and is considered to be a new structure, also known simply as Novi or Novi Grad. Problem exist in correct dating of its construction, but some medieval charters suggest 1392, or late 14th century, as time of its construction, during Radislav Pavlović at the family's helm.

Old Borač

See also

Borač (fortress)
Radinović-Pavlović
List of fortifications in Bosnia and Herzegovina

References

p
p
Medieval Bosnia and Herzegovina architecture